Dirk Jan Dignus "Dick" Dees (born 13 December 1944) is a retired Dutch politician. A member of the People's Party for Freedom and Democracy (VVD), he served as State Secretary for Welfare, Health and Culture from 1986 to 1989.

Decorations

References

External links

Official
  Drs. D.J.D. (Dick) Dees Parlement & Politiek
  Drs. D.J.D. Dees (VVD) Eerste Kamer der Staten-Generaal

 
 

1944 births
Living people
20th-century Dutch civil servants
20th-century Dutch male writers
20th-century Dutch politicians
21st-century Dutch civil servants
21st-century Dutch male writers
21st-century Dutch politicians
Commanders of the Order of Orange-Nassau
Dutch corporate directors
Dutch nonprofit executives
Dutch nonprofit directors
Dutch health and wellness writers
Dutch pharmacists
Dutch technology writers
Knights of the Order of the Netherlands Lion
Members of the House of Representatives (Netherlands)
Members of the Senate (Netherlands)
Municipal councillors of Breda
People from Sluis
People's Party for Freedom and Democracy politicians
State Secretaries for Health of the Netherlands
Utrecht University alumni